Pentewan Valley is one of four new civil parishes created on 1 April 2009 for the St Austell district of mid Cornwall, England, United Kingdom. The population including Gracca, Lavalsa Meor, London Apprentice and Lower Porthpean at the 2011 Census was 826.

The new parish is the largest of the four by area and is rural in character. It includes the settlements of Trewhiddle, London Apprentice and Pentewan and is represented by nine councillors.

Pentewan, the coastal village from which the new parish derives its name, is approximately three miles (5 km) south of St Austell.

The name Pentewan Valley also applies to the valley of the St Austell River between St Austell and the sea at Pentewan village.

References

Civil parishes in Cornwall
Populated coastal places in Cornwall